Polytrichothrips is a genus of thrips in the family Phlaeothripidae.

Species
 Polytrichothrips geoffri
 Polytrichothrips laticeps

References

Phlaeothripidae
Thrips
Thrips genera